Civil Auto Liability is a Romanian motor-vehicle liability insurance policy that covers damages caused to third parties. This insurance is legally mandatory for any motor vehicle owner in Romania. The insurance policy  it is also known as RCA.
In case of an accident this insurance policy covers repair costs incurred by the party determined to not be at fault.

References 

Liability insurance
Vehicle insurance